The ships of the F120 Köln class of frigates were the first major warships built in Germany after World War II.

They were the world's first ships to feature a combined diesel and gas propulsion system. The ships received numerous refits during their long careers with new electronics and torpedo tubes. They were replaced by Type 122 frigates in the 1980s and four ships were sold to the Turkish Navy.

List of ships

All ships were stationed as second frigate squadron in Wilhelmshaven.

See also
List of frigates
List of German Federal Navy ships
List of naval ships of Germany
List of naval ship classes of Germany
Lists of ship launches in:  1959, 1962
Lists of ship commissionings in:  1961, 1962, 1963, 1964
Lists of ship decommissionings in:  1982, 1983, 1988, 1989

References

Gardiner, Robert and Stephen Chumbley. Conway's All The World's Fighting Ships 1947–1995. Annapolis, Maryland, USA: Naval Institute Press, 1995. .
Prézelin, Bernard and A.D. Baker III. The Naval Institute Guide to Combat Fleets of the World 1990/1991. Annapolis, Maryland, USA: Naval Institute Press, 1990. .

 
Frigate classes